Curiofrea curiosa is a species of beetle in the family Cerambycidae, and the only species in the genus Curiofrea. It was described by Galileo and Martins in 1999.

References

Lamiinae
Beetles described in 1999